Payal Rajput (born 5 December 1992) is an Indian actress who primarily works in Telugu and Punjabi films. She made her film debut with the Punjabi film Channa Mereya (2017), for which she received Filmfare Awards Punjabi for Best Debut Actress. Rajput then made her Hindi film debut with Veerey Ki Wedding (2018).

Rajput started her acting career with the Hindi television series Sapnon Se Bhare Naina (2010). She then appeared in shows including Aakhir Bahu Bhi Toh Beti Hee Hai and Maha Kumbh: Ek Rahasaya, Ek Kahani. She made her Telugu film debut with RX 100 (2018), for which she received SIIMA Award for Best Female Debut (Telugu). Her other notable films include, Venky Mama (2019), Shava Ni Girdhari Lal (2021) and Head Bush (2022), her Kannada film debut.

Early life and career
Rajput was born on 5 December 1992 in Delhi, India.

Rajput started her television career in Sapnon Se Bhare Naina as Sonakshi. She played the lead role of Siya in Aakhir Bahu Bhi Toh Beti Hee Hai, in Gustakh Dil as Ishaani and in Mahakumbh: Ek Rahasaya, Ek Kahani as Maya.

In 2017, she debuted in the Punjabi film industry by playing the role of the main female lead, Kainaat Dhillon, in Channa Mereya, opposite Ninja. The film was a remake of the Marathi film Sairat, and was released on 14 July 2017. She made her Telugu film debut with 2018 film RX 100.

Filmography

Films

Television

Music videos

Awards and nominations

References

External links
 
 

Living people
Indian television actresses
Punjabi people
Actresses from Punjab, India
Actresses in Telugu cinema
South Indian International Movie Awards winners
1992 births